Kalahasteeswarar Temple is a Hindu temple dedicated to Shiva located at Kumbakonam in Thanjavur district, Tamil Nadu, India.

Presiding deity
The moolavar presiding deity, is found in his manifestation as Kalahasteeswarar. His consort, Parvati, is known as Gnanambikai.

Speciality
12 Shiva temples are connected with Mahamaham festival which happens once in 12 years in Kumbakonam. They are :
Kasi Viswanathar Temple, 
Kumbeswarar Temple, 
Someswarar Temple, 
Nageswara Temple, 
Kalahasteeswarar Temple, 
Gowthameswarar Temple, 
Kottaiyur Kodeeswarar temple 
Amirthakalasanathar Temple, 
Banapuriswarar Temple, 
Abimukeswarar Temple, Kumbakonam, 
Kambatta Visvanathar Temple and 
Ekambareswarar Temple. 
This temple is one among them.

Renovation
The temple was renovated by Serfoji of Thanjavur.

Mahasamprokshanam
The Mahasamprokshanam also known as Kumbabishegam of the temple was held on 26 October 2015.

See also
 Hindu temples of Kumbakonam
 Mahamaham

References

External links

Mahasamprokshanam 26 October 2015

Hindu temples in Kumbakonam
Shiva temples in Thanjavur district